The Deductions of Colonel Gore is a 1924 detective novel by the Irish-born writer Lynn Brock. It was the first in his series of seven novels featuring the character of Colonel Wyckham Gore. Gore enjoyed popularity during the early stages of the Golden Age of Detective Fiction. It was also published under the alternative title The Barrington Mystery.

Synopsis
Colonel Gore gives a Masai knife as a wedding present to Barbara Lethbridge. When he returns to England the following year he finds she stands accused or murder, as the knife has been plunged into a blackmailer Barrington with whom she is involved. Against his better instincts Gore takes on the role of amateur detective in order to clear her name.

References

Bibliography
 Reilly, John M. Twentieth Century Crime & Mystery Writers. Springer, 2015.

1924 British novels
British mystery novels
British thriller novels
Novels by Lynn Brock
Novels set in England
British detective novels
William Collins, Sons books
1924 debut novels